Ángelo Medina (born April 21, 1956, Aguadilla, Puerto Rico) is an international music executive.

Though his given name is Ángel, he was in youth dubbed "Ángelo", given it was his father's art name as a radio presenter. He obtained a B.A. in Labour-Management Relations from the University of Puerto Rico, Rio Piedras  He is the former manager of Ricky Martin and is the actual manager of Latin Rock giants Maná, Romeo Santos, Draco Rosa, and other well-known Latin artists. President of Empresas Angelo Medina, he has for more than four decades presided over the careers of multiple artists to achieve sweeping commercial success, earning credit as a historically important contributor to the Latin music business Additionally, he is involved in sports promoting (basketball, baseball, and boxing). He owned the Cangrejeros de Santurce (basketball) franchise and also, until its cessation, owned the television sports network Deportes 13.

References

Billboard Key Power 2011/ July

1959 births
20th-century American businesspeople
American music managers
American sports businesspeople
Living people
People from Aguadilla, Puerto Rico
Puerto Rican business executives
University of Puerto Rico, Río Piedras Campus alumni